The following is a list of primary and secondary schools in Nepal. Tertiary schools are included in the separate list of universities and colleges in Nepal.

There are seventy-seven districts and this list is grouped alphabetically by district (along with a section on international schools in Nepal). This list includes schools of international and national standard from various districts.

International schools
The following are international schools, which have distance-learning centres in Nepal.

They are: 

 The British School, Kathmandu – Patan, Lalitpur District
 Budhanilkantha School – Budhanilkantha, Kathmandu District, Nepal
 Delhi Public School, Biratnagar – Biratnagar, Morang District
 Delhi Public School, Dharan – Dharan, Sunsari District 
 Golden Peak High School – Chabahil, Kathmnadu
 Lincoln School, Kathmandu - Ravibhawan, Kathmandu District
 Little Angels' School – Hattiban, Lalitpur District
 Malpi International School – Panauti, Kabhrepalanchok District
 Premier International IB World School – Khumaltar Height, Lalitpur District
 St. Xavier's School, Godavari – Godavari, Lalitpur District
 St. Xavier's School, Jawalakhel – Jawalakhel, Lalitpur District

 DAV Sushil Kedia Vishwa Bharati Higher Secondary, Kathmandu, Nepal – Jawalakhel, Lalitpur District
 Himalayan white house college
 Imperial World School, Hattigauda, Kathmandu
 NCEB School, Nagarjun, Kathmandu
 Pathshala Nepal Foundation-  (New Baneshwor, Kathmandu District) (Bagdol, Lalitpur District)
 Pragyan Academy, Jhapa-Nepal
 Rato Bangala School - Patan, Lalitpur District
 Samata School – Nepal
 SOS Hermann Gmeiner School, Sanothimi-Nepal

Banke District
Schools in the Banke District include:

Bright Hope Academy, Karkando-18, Nepalgunj
Shree Shaileshwori Vidhya Niketan, Adarsha nagar-10, Banke

Bara District 
Schools in the Bara District include:
Bal Bidhya Mandir Secondary Boarding School, Kalaiya - 06
Bal Ekta Secondary Boarding School, Kalaiya - 06.
Bright Land Secondary Boarding School, Kalaiya - 06
Children World Secondary Boarding School, Kalaiya - 04,
Co-Operative Secondary Boarding School, Kalaiya - 04
Divine Cosmopolitan Secondary Boarding School, Kalaiya - 03,
Evergreen English Secondary School, Jitpur 3, Nasim nagar.
Ex-serviceman secondary boarding school, Simara
Gyan Deep Secondary Boarding School, Kalaiya - 06
International Secondary Boarding School, Kalaiya - 01
Jivan Jyoti English secondary School, Simara
Merry-Gold Secondary Boarding School, Kalaiya - 06,
Mount Everest Secondary Boarding School, Simara
Rastriya vibhuti samudayik shikhsa sadan, Simara,
 Shree Bhoj Bhagat Secondary School, Parwanipur 3, Lipanimal
Shree Kankali Secondary School, Simraungarh 2,
Shree Nepal Rastriya MauwaDevi Secondary School, Dakaha-Painito,
Shree Nepal Rastriya Secondary School, Simara
Shree Nepal Rastriya Secondary School, Jitpur 3,
Shree Nepal Rastriya Secondary School, Pachrauta 1, Piparpati.
Shree Nepal Rastriya Secondary School, Pachrauta 4, Beldari.
Shree Nepal Rastriya Secondary School, Simraungarh 3, Khajani.
Siddhi Vinayak Secondary Boarding School, Kalaiya - 06
Simara College, Simara.
Simara Public English Secondary School, Simara,
St.Alphonsa English School, Simara
The Sunny Academy Secondary Boarding School, Kalaiya - 04.
Shree Nepal National secondary school, Kalaiya - 23,

Bardiya District
Schools in the Bardiya District include:

 Bardiya Academy – Kalika-8, Tilkana

 Little Heaven English Academy – Gulariya-5, Bardiya
 Shree Guransh higher Secondary School Madhuwan -6, bardiya

Bhaktapur District
Schools in the Bhaktapur District include:

 AJ English Secondary School – Suryavinayak
 Ananta Sikshya Sadan, Tarkhagal, Suryabinayak -4, Bhaktapur – Suryabinayak – Montessori Based Preschool
 Gundu English Secondary School – Suryavinayak
 Mahendra Vidya Ashram, Bhaktapur
 Rajarshi Gurukul – Sallaghari
 Shree Mahendra Shanti Secondary School, Balkot,( Bhaktapur)
 Siddhartha Vidyapeeth Secondary Boarding School – Gatthaghar-3, Madhayapur thimi, Bhaktapur
 SOS Hermann Gmeiner School, Sanothimi – Sanothimi, Bhaktapur
 We Kids School – Suryavinayak
 Vidhya Vikash Secondary Boarding School – Jagati, 7 Bhaktapur
 Birendra Sainik Awasiya Mahavidyalaya - Sallaghari, Bhaktapur
 Kathmandu World School - Gundu, Bhaktapur

Bhojpur District
Schools in the Bhojpur District include:

 Yashodhara Secondary School – Taksar, Bhojpur Municipality

Chitwan District
Schools in the Chitwan District include:

 Khairahani Secondary School - Khairahani, Chitwan

 Angels' World Secondary Boarding School - Parsauni, Chitwan
 Aroma e secondary school bhatatpur 10- chitwan
 Holy Vision Public School - Yagyapuri, Chitwan
 Greenland Public School - Bharatpur-12, Chitwan
 Gyandarshan english secondary school-bharatpur11 chitwan
 Jana Jagriti Secondary School - Ratnanagar-14, Chitwan
 Lotus academy bhatatpur - bharatpur 11chitwan 
 Lyceum International Model School- Ratnanagar-1, Nipani, Chitwan
 Marigold Secondary English School - Khairahani, Chitwan
 National Boarding High School - Khairahani-8, Parsa, Chitwan
 Secondary School Gawai - Khairahani -13, Gawai, Chitwan 
 Sky Rider Secondary English Boarding School - Ratnanagar-13, Tandi, Chitwan

Dang District
Schools in the Dang District include:

 Divine Temple Academy – Tulsipur Dang
 Gorkha Secondary School – Tulsipur Dang
 Janajyoti Vidyamandir – Ghorahi Dang
 Nepal Police School - Gulariya Dang
 Padmodaya Public Model Secondary School - Bharatpur Dang
 Shanti Deep English School – Tulsipur Dang

Alpha English Boarding School - Ghorahi Dang
BP Koirala Higher Secondary School - Shantinagar Dang
Chandrodaya Vidya Kunj Boarding School - Jaspur Dang
Deep Jyoti Secondary English Boarding School - Tulsipur Dang
Deepshikha Higher Secondary School - Ghorahi Dang
Gorkha International Higher Secondary School - Ghorahi Dang
Gorkha Model Secondary School - Lamahi Dang
Gurukul International Academy - Ratanpur Dang
Gyanmala Academy - Sarra Dang
Heritage Pre-Primary School - Ghorahi Dang
Higher Secondary School Rajhena - Rajhena Dang
Ideal English Medium Secondary Boarding School - Tulsipur Dang
Jyotishmati Vidyapeeth - Lamahi Dang
Little Angles School Rapti - Bhalubang Dang
Mahendra Higher Secondary School, Tulsipur, Dang
Mount View English Boarding School - Ghorahi Dang
Pearl Academy, Ghorahi Dang
Rapti Galaxy Public School – Satbariya, Dang
Rajvidhya Pathshala Dang Pvt.Ltd - Ghorahi Dang
Rosy Buds Bal Batika Secondary School - Lamahi Dang
Shree Serene Valley Public Secondary School- Mourighat, Dang
Shanti Niketan Boarding School - Ghorahi Dang
Shanti Sudha Secondary School - Ghorahi Dang
Shree Adarsha Higher Secondary School - Lamahi Dang
Shree Deep Secondary School - Lahalaura Dang
Shree Mahendra higher secondary school, Dang
Shree Secondary School – Lamahi (Falkapur) Dang
Shree Sworgadwari Secondary School - Narayanpur Dang
Siddhartha Academy Higher Secondary School - Ratanpur Dang
Star Secondary English Boarding School - Ghorahi Dang
Subha Shandesh English Boarding School - Ghorahi Dang
Sunlight Modern Higher Secondary School – Lamahi Dang
Valley Top English Boarding School - Ghorahi Dang

Darchula District
Schools in the Darchula District include:

 Mahendra Higher Secondary School – Khalanga, Api Municipality

 Galainath Secondary School, Darchula (गलाइनाथ माध्यमिक विद्यालय, दार्चुला) 	Location: Jharkada, Darchula, Sudurpaschim Pradesh, Nepal
 Ganesh Binayak Secondary School, Darchula	
 Gaurilamandau Secondary School, Darchula (गौरीलामान्डौ माध्यमिक विद्यालय, दार्चुला)	Location: Hikila, Darchula, Sudurpaschim Pradesh, Nepal
 Gokuleshwor Secondary School, Darchula (गोकुलेश्वर माध्यमिक विद्यालय, दार्चुला)	
 Himalaya Secondary School, Darchula (हिमालय माध्यमिक विद्यालय, दार्चुला) 	Location: Huti, Darchula, Sudurpaschim Pradesh, Nepal
 Hunainath Secondary School, Kuni, Darchula (हुनैनाथ माध्यमिक विद्यालय, कुणी, दार्चुला)	Location: Lekam Rural Municipality-2, Kuni, Darchula, Sudurpashchim Pradesh, Nepal
 Hunainath Secondary School, Ratamata, Darchula (हुनैनाथ माध्यमिक विद्यालय, रातामाता, दार्चुला)	Location: Lekam Rural Municipality-4, Ratamata, Darchula, Sudurpashchim Pradesh, Nepal
 Huskar Secondary School, Darchula (हुस्कर माध्यमिक विद्यालय, दार्चुला) 	Location: Mahakali-3, Katai, Darchula, Sudurpaschim Pradesh, Nepal
 Janabikash Secondary School, Darchula (जन विकाश माध्यमिक विद्यालय, दार्चुला	Location: Bramhadev, Khalanga, Mahakali, Darchula, Sudurpaschim Pradesh, Nepal
 Khandeshwari Secondary School, Darchula (खान्देश्वरी माध्यमिक विद्यालय, दार्चुला)	Location: Khandeshwari, Darchula, Sudurpaschim Pradesh, Nepal
 Krishna Secondary School, Balanch, Darchula (कृष्णा माध्यमिक विद्यालय, बालाञ्च, दार्चुला	Location: Shailyashikhar-1, Balanch, Darchula, Sudurpashchim Pradesh, Nepal
 Krishna Secondary School, Dandakot, Darchula (कृष्ण माध्यमिक विद्यालय, डाँडाकोट, दार्चुला)	Location: Dandakot, Darchula, Sudurpashchim Pradesh, Nepal
 Krishna Secondary School, Darchula (कृष्ण माध्यमिक विद्यालय, दार्चुला)	Location: Lali, Darchula, Sudurpaschim Pradesh, Nepal
 Latinath Secondary School, Chandanpur, Darchula (लाटिनाथ माध्यमिक विद्यालय, चन्दनपुर, दार्चुला	Location: Chandanpur, Darchula, Sudurpashchim Pradesh, Nepal
 Latinath Secondary School, Darchula लाटिनाथ माध्यमिक विद्यालय, दार्चुला)	Location: Khar Marma, Darchula, Sudurpaschim Pradesh, Nepal
 Mahendra Model Secondary School, Darchula (महेन्द्र मोडेल माध्यमिक विद्यालय, दार्चुला	Location: Mahakali Municipality-4, Khalanga, Darchula, Sudurpaschim Pradesh, Nepal
 Malikarjun Secondary School, Mad, Darchula (मालिकार्जुन माध्यमिक विद्यालय, म्याड, दार्चुला) 	Location: Prem Nagar Mad, Darchula, Sudurpashchim Pradesh, Nepa
 Malikarjun Secondary School, Mimili, Darchula (मालिकाअर्जुन  माध्यमिक विद्यालय, मिमिली, दार्चुला)	Location: Mimili, Darchula, Sudurpashchim Pradesh, Nepal
 Rastriya Secondary School, Darchula (राष्ट्रिय माध्यमिक विद्यालय, दार्चुला)	Location: Dattu, Darchula, Sudurpaschim Pradesh, Nepal
 Saraswati Secondary School, Darchula (सरस्वती माध्यमिक विद्यालय, दार्चुला)	Location: Uku, Darchula, Sudurpaschim Pradesh, Nepal
 Satya Prakash Secondary School, Darchula	Dethala
 Shankarpur Secondary School, (शंकरपुर माध्यमिक विद्यालय, दार्चुला)	Location: Shankarpur, Pasti, Darchula, Sudurpaschim Pradesh, Nepal

Dhading District
Schools in the Dhading District include:
 

 Shree Chandrodaya Higher Secondary School – Benighat-9, Bishaltar

Advance Academy, Dhading Besi
Balmandir Higher Secondary school, Dhading Besi
Children park higher secondary school, Dhading Besi
Dhading Boarding higher secondary school, Dhading Besi
Nalang Model Academy Secondary School, Siddhalek-2, Dhading*
Shree Bageshwori Secondary School, Richoktar, Dhading
shree mahendra higher secondary school, Nilkantha, Dhading
Shree Mahendrodaya Hss school, Dhading
Shree Nilkantha New Model Higher Secondary School, Dhading Besi
Shree panchakanya secondary school, Khalte
Shree Sarasowti Higher Secondary School, Nilkantha 14 (Dhuwakot), Dhading
Shree Gauri Shankar Basic Level School, Nilkantha 14 (Dhuwakot), Dhading
The Rising Village Secondary School

Dhanusha District
Schools in the Dhanusha District include:

Angels' Secondary English Boarding School, Saketnagar-9, Janakpur
Daffodils Public School Janakpur, Vidhyapati Chowk, Janakpurdham-4
New Life E B School

Dolakha District
Schools in the Dolakha District include:
 

 Baiteshwor Higher secondary School – Baiteshwor-6, Namdu
Dharmasala Basic School, Kshetrapa
 Hanumanteshwor Higher Secondary School, Mainapokhari
Jaldevi Secondary School, Mainapokhari
Jiri secondary school, Jiri, Dolakha
Kalinchok Higher Secondary School, Charikot
Kshetrawati Higher Secondary School, Kshetrapa
Silver Star English Boarding School, Mainapokhari
Tschorolpa English School, Kabre

Gorkha District
Schools in the Gorkha District include:
 Shree Bhawani Higher Secondary School – Palungtar Municipality 

 Mahendra Jyoti School, (Gorkha) 
 Mahendra Jyoti Secondary School, Durbar Marga, (Gorkha)
 Shree Mahendra Leela Secondary School Siranchok, (Gorkha) 
 Shree Mahendra Shakti Secondary School , Bakrang, (Gorkha)

Jhapa District
Schools in the Jhapa District include:

 Balmiki Education Foundation — Birtamode -02
 Brighter Star Secondary School— Damak -09
 Damak Model Higher Secondary School — Damak -10
 Gyanjyoti Higher Secondary School —  Rajgadh -6
 Haldibari Higher Secondary School —  Haldibari -9
 Shree Harikul Model Higher Secondary School —  Surunga
 Sigma International English School —  Haldibari -4
 Singha Devi Higher Secondary School — Damak -10

 Bidhya Laxmi Secondary English School — Damak -4
 Canary Academy-Haldibari-2
 Everest High Secondary School — Damak-9
 Everest Smart Education Academy — Birtamode -06
 Himalayan English Academy, Dhulabari — Dhulabari -3
 Holy Bell English Higher Secondary School — Dhulabari
 Kankai Multiple College — Surunga
 Mechi Shiksha Niketan — Damak-9
 Mahendra Jyoti Higher Secondary School, Garamani, (Jhapa)
 Mahendra Ratna Higher Secondary School, Birtamode, (Jhapa)
 Niharika English Boarding Secondary School —  Kamal -03 (Best School)
 Newton's Education Academy — Birtamode -05
 Shree Bhagawati Secondary School —  Shivasatakshi Municipality -7, Bangdada, Jhapa
 Shree Mahendra Higher Secondary School, Kamal Gaun Palika, (Jhapa)
 Shree Mahendra Secondary School, Sharanamati, (Jhapa)
 Shree Panini Higher Secondary School —  Damak 9 sanobaraghare.
 Shree Rastriya Ramaniya Adarsha Uchha Ma Vi —  Dudhe
 Suryodaya English School —  Damak -11

Kailali District
Schools in the Kailali District include:

 Thekraj Secondary School – Attariya Municipality-10, Ghodasuwa
 Aishwarya Vidya Niketan, Hasanpur, Dhangadhi sub metropolitan city

Kanchanpur District
Schools in the Kanchanpur District include:

 Adarsh Vidya Niketan Secondary School
 Florida International Boarding Higher Secondary School
 Mahendra Higher Secondary School
 Radiant Secondary School

 Bhrikuti Higher Secondary school
 International Public Secondary School
 Kanchan Vidya Mandir Higher Secondary School
 Little Buddha Academy Secondary School 
 Morning Glory Secondary School
 Shree Diamond Public Academy Higher Secondary School
 Shree Nobel Academy
 Shree Rastriya Bal Vidyalya
 Sunrise Public Secondary School

Kaski District
Schools in the Kaski District include:

 Gandaki Boarding School, Lamachour
 Paramount Public School, Pokhara
 Shree Amarsingh Model Higher Secondary School, Pokhara
 SOS Hermann Gmeiner Higher Secondary School, Pokhara

 Bal Mandir Secondary School, Pokhara
 Gyankunj Vidyashram Mohariya, Pokhara-31
 KEF Secondary School, Pokhara
 Mahendra Secondary School, Naya bazar, (Pokhara)
 Mahendra Secondary School, bhalam, (Pokhara)
 Motherland Secondary School, Masbar, Pokhara
 New Light English Boarding Secondary School, Pokhara
 Rastriya Higher Secondary School, Pokhara
 Samata Shikshya Niketan, Parsyang
 Shishu Kaylan English Boarding School, Chhorepatan
 Shree Bharati Bhawan Secondary School
 Shree Mahendra Secondary School, Lahachowk, Kaski
 Shree Mahendra Secondary School, Pokhara lekhnath, (Pokhara)

Kathmandu District
Schools in the Kathmandu District include:

 Awareness International Academy
 Brihaspati VidyaSadan 
 Chelsea International Academy
 Classic College International
 Green Hills Academy, Tarakeshwor, Kathmandu
 Gyankunj School
 Kathmandu National School, Old Baneshour, Kathmandu
 Manakamana Higher Secondary School
 Modern Newa English School
 Naaya Aayam Multi-Disciplinary Institute
 Rupy's International School
 Sewa Sadan English Boarding School

 Adhyayan School, Samakhusi Chowk, Tokha
 Angel Heart Secondary School
 Bhanubhakta Memorial Higher Secomdary School
 Edify International School, Kalanki, Kathmandu
 Golden Bud School, Kageshwori Manohara, Gothatar
 Gothatar English Secondary School, Kageshwori Manohara - 8, Gothatar
 Gyandeep Shiksha Sadan, Gaurinagar-7, Kathmandu
 Hebron Public School, Koteshwor, Kathmandu
 Jugal English Medium School, Kapan,
 Kaasthamdap Vidhyalaya 
 Kamal School
 Little Moon High School, Kapan, Faika
 Loyalty Academy, Ektabasti, Kathmandu
Mahendra Bhawan Higher Secondary Boarding School, Gyaneshwor, (Kathmandu)
Mahendra Bhawan Girls' Higher Secondary Boarding School, (Kathmandu)
Mahendra Rastriya Secondary School, Baluwatar,(Kathmandu) 
Mahendra Boudha Secondary School, Kathmandu
Mahendra Secondary School, Shankharapur , Kathmandu
 Padmodaya Secondary School, Ramshah Path, Kathmandu
 Pascal International Academy, Sarkaridhara, Samakhusi, Kathmandu
Shankari English medium school
Shri Mahendra Saraswati Sewa Lower Secondary School, Teku, Kathmandu
 Srijana Gyansagar Secondary School, Tarakeshwor-4, Kathmandu
 Tilingatar Higher Secondary School
 Whitefield Higher Secondary School, Chhetrapati, Kathmandu
 Wisdom English Academy, Kalanki, Kathmandu
 Xavier International School, Boudha, Tushal

Kavrepalanchok District
Schools in the Kavrepalanchok District include:

 Kathmandu University High School – Chaukot
 Malpi International School – Panauti; 
 Shree Ganesh Secondary School – Bhimkhori-8, Shikharpur
 Kavre Deaf School – Banepa Municipality-9, Nayabasti, Krishi Marga

Lalitpur District
Schools in the Lalitpur District include:

 Little Angels' School (L.A.S)
 Ideal Model School (I.M.S.)

 Annal Jyoti Boarding School (AJS)
 Bluebird English Secondary School
 Dynamic Public School
 Gamvir Samudra Setu (G.S.S)
 Kshitiz Secondary Boarding School (ksbs)
Mahendra Adarsha Vidhyashram Secondary School , Satdobato, Lalitpur
Mahendra Bhrikuti Secondary School, Lalitpur
 Nightingale International Secondary School, Kupondole, Lalitpur
Aryan Yadav Higher School, Lalitpur
Jugal English Secondary School,Dhapakhel,Lalitpur
IJ Pioneer High School ,Hattiban Lalitupr
Pritam Yadav Piprahi School , Lalitpur
Aayushi Yadav High School , Lalitpur
 Pathshala Nepal Foundation (P.N.F)
 Pushpanjali Secondary School (PSS)
Shree Mahendra Adarsha Higher Secondary School, Mahalaxmi ,Lalitpur
Shree Mahendra Gram Secondary School, Tikathali, Lalitpur
 Tripadma Vidyashram Secondary School
 Unique Acadmey/College

Mahottari District
Schools in Mahottari District include:

 Janaki Yugantar English Boarding School – Ramgopalpuir -6
 Ram Narayan Ayodhya Higher Secondary School, Pipara
 Shonphi Dashain Higher Secondary School
 TSEBS Mahottari

 Liladhar Educational Academy, Ekdara - 4 Chakwa
Shree Mahendra secondary school, Singyahi, Mahottari
Shri Mahendra National Higher Secondary School, Ramgopalpur, Mahottari

Morang District
Schools in the Morang District include

Mahendra higher secondary school, Itahara, (Morang)
Mount Hermon Children Academy, Kanepokhari-6, Ramailo Morang
Naragram Madhyamik Bidhyalaya, Tankisinuwari
Shree Aadarsha Uchha Madhyamik Bidhyalaya, Biratnagar
Shree Mahendra Higher Secondary School, Biratnagar
Shree Mahendra secondary school, Dangihat, (Morang)
Shree Morang Marigold English High School,  Pathari Shanischare 9, Morang
Shree Panchakanya Prathamik Bidhyalaya, Baijanathpur
Shree Panchayat Uchha Madhyamik Bidhyalaya, Pathari
Shree Pokharia Uchha Madhyamik Bidhyalaya, Biratnagar
Shree Radhika Uchha Madhyamik Bidhyalaya, Urlabari
Shree Saraswati Prathamik Bidhyalaya, Pathri Sanischare 
Shree Saraswati Uchha Madhyamik Bidhyalaya, Biratnagar
Shree Shanti Nimna Madhyamik Bidhyala, Urlabari
Shree Sunjhoda Madhyamik Bidhyalaya, Urlabari
Shree Sunpakuwa Uchha Madhyamik Bidhyalaya, Urlabari
Shree Janta Madhyamik Bidhyalaya, Rangeli-5, Amgachhi
Unique Academy Tankisinwari-Shanti Chowk

Higher Secondary Schools
        
Arniko Higher Secondary School
Devkota Memorial Higher Secondary School

Bal Kalyan Vidhya Mandhir
Bhanu Memorial English Boarding
Budhanilakantha Boarding
Everest Higher Secondary School
Gautam Buddha Higher Secondary School
Greenland Int's Higher Secondary School
Janak Boarding
Kantipur Higher Secondary School
Lord Buddha Higher Secondary School
Mahendra Secondary School
Manokamana Higher Secondary School
Merryland Higher Secondary School
Mills Madhyamik Viddyalaya
Modern Higher Secondary School
Shikshadeep Higher Secondary School
Shree Higher Secondary School
Shree Janta Model Higher Secondary School
Shree Pokhariya Higher Secondary School
Shree Ram Higher Secondary Boarding School
Shree Satya Narayan Higher Secondary School
Sirjana Gyankunja Higher Secondary School
St. Joseph's Higher Secondary School, Morang 
 Sunbarshi Secondary School, Ratuwamai-5, Morang, Nepal

Secondary Schools

Eden National Boarding School

Aadarsha Vidya Mandir
Arniko School
Arpan Secondary English
Azalea Boarding
Bal Kalyan Vidhya Mandir
Bal Udhyan
Birat Children Academy
Balmiki Secondary English Medium
Birat Co-operative Secondary Boarding
Bright Angels' Secondary
Budhanilkantha English Boarding
Crescent Public Boarding
Deokota Memorial
Don Bosco School
Everest English Boarding
Galaxy Public
Gems International Secondary Boarding
Godavari Secondary English
Graded English Medium Secondary
Jamia Islamia Secondary
Jaycee Bal Sadan
Kanchanjunga Academy
Kanchanjungha English
Koshi Vidya Mandir
Lord Buddha English Boarding Biratnagar 10 Tintoliya
Malabika English Boarding
Namuna Vidya Mandir Secondary
Nawa Tara English
New Moon Secondary Boarding
Paragon Academy
Pole Star National Secondary
Purwanchal Biddya Sadan Secondary
Rising Nepal Secondary Boarding School, Ratuwamai Municipality-6
Shree Sagarmatha Secondary Boarding, Panchali
Shree Annapurna Academy
Shree Mills Secondary
Shree Saraswati Madhyamik Vidyalya
Siddhartha Sishu Sadan
St. Joseph's Boarding
Sunshine Secondary English
Vinayak Boarding Secondary School

Myagdi District
Schools in the Myagdi District include:

 Janapriya Higher Secondary School

Nawalparasi District
Schools in the Nawalparasi District include:

 Gaindakot English School – Gaindakot Municipality;
 Lakhan Thapa Galaxy Academy- Binayi Triben-2 Rural municipality
 Shree Janata Higher Secondary School – Naya Belhani
Shree Mahendra Secondary School, Somani, (Nawalparasi)
Shree Mahendra Secondary School, Sarawal, (Nawalparasi)
 Vijaya Samudayik Sikshya Sadan – Gaindakot

Panchthar District
Schools in the Panchthar District include:

 Vidhya Bardan Boarding English School – Phidim

Parsa District
Schools in the Parsa District include:

 Alpine Secondary School
 Delhi Public School, Parsa
 Gautam Secondary School
 Shree Nrisingh Madhyamik vidhyalaya pipramath 14 , Birgunj
 Trijuddha Mahavir Prasad Raghuvir Ram Secondary School
 Universal Boarding Secondary School

Ramechhap District
Schools in the Ramechhap District include:

 Tamakoshi English Boarding School – Manthali

Rautahat District
Schools in the Rautahat District include:
 Bal Niketan Secondary English Boarding School
 Mid-Regional Police Boarding High School – Jigadhiya; a branch of the Nepal Police School
 Moonlight secondary School
 Mount Everest Residential School
 Pathibhara Secondary School

Rupandehi District

Sankhuwasabha District
Schools in the Sankhuwasabha District include:

Shree Mahendra Higher Secondary School, Khandbari, Sankhuwasabha

Saptari District 

Schools in the Saptari District include:

 Aadarsha Secondary English School – Mahuli-9
 Little Flower Secondary School
 Premier Secondary Boarding School
 Sharda English Secondary School – Kathauna Bazar, Shambhunath
 Durga Secondary School
 Global English Boarding School
 Green boarding secondary school
 Green secondary school
 kankalini Academy Rupani Road Rajbiraj
 kesho anirodha Ma.Bi.
 Laxmi English Boarding School Rajbiraj-5. Saptari
 Maa Sarawati English School
 Manokamna Higher S. School
 Maxell English Boarding School,Rajbiraj
 New Rose Public English School
 New Sunlight English School
 New sunshine english academy diman-4 saptari
 Peace Zone Model School
 Rajdevi Secondary School
 Saptarsihi Educational Academy
 Shanti Niketan Educational Academy
 Shree 5 Mahendra higher secondary school, khadak, (Saptari)
 Shree Paanch Mahendra Chunni Secondary School , Manraja, Saptari
 Shiva International Boarding Secondary School
 Universal Academy, Septari
 World Vision Modern Sec. School & Campus

Sindhupalchowk District
Schools in the Sindhupalchowk District include:

 Private Paradise Secondary School – Bahrabise-8 

Mahendra Pratap Secondary School , Dhuskun, Sindhupalchok
Shree Mahendra Higher Secondary School, Kunchok, Sindhupalchok
Shree Mahendra Secondary School, Ichok, Sindhupalchok

Siraha District

Schools in the Siraha District include:

 Aeron hill secondary school
 Balsansar English Boarding School
 Eastern Star English Boarding School Khirauna
 Everest English Boarding School
 Evergreen Academy Siraha
 Galaxy public school, Siraha madar 16
 Kinder Garten English School
 Moon light secondary school
 Morning pearl secondary school
 Mount Everest secondary school
 Nepal Avalanche Academy, Ramaul
 Pentagon Academy
 Purbaaanchal Secondary school
 Sagarmatha higher secondary school, Mirchiya
 Sarswar Nath higher secondary school, Sarswar
 Secondary School, Ramaul
 Shree Aadharbhut Bidyalaya, Lattatol
 Shree Chandra Higher Secondary School
 Shree Janta Aadharbhut bidyalaya salampur charari Sukhipur na.pa 3
 Shree Janta Secondary School, Brahampuri
  SHREE SUNDAR HIGER SECONDARY SCHOOL AAYRAHI -5 
 Shree Kanya Primary School
 Siddhartha sissu niketan ma vi. school. (near shiv chock)

Sunsari District
Schools in the Sunsari District include:

 Godawari Vidhya Mandir – Itahari
 Navjyoti English School - Dharan
 Nawayug Academy – Inaruwa-9
 Parvat Secondary Boarding School

Mahendra higher secondary school, Itahara, (Morang)
Shree Mahendra Higher Secondary School, Itahari
Shree Mahendra secondary school, Dangihat, (Morang)
 Jagannath Dedraj Janta Secondary school - Kalabanjar

Surkhet District
Schools in the Surkhet District include:

 Kopila Valley School operated by BlinkNow Foundation – Birendranagar

Syangja District
Schools in the Syangja District include:

 Shree Gandaki Primary School – Bhattarai Danda
 Shree Sankhar Mohami Secondary School – Mohami, Sankhar

Mahendra Higher Secondary School, Jagat Bhanjyang, Syangja
Shree Mahendra secondary school, Malyangkot, (Syangja)
 Shree Sarbajanik Higher Secondary School -  Malunga

Tanahun District
Schools in the Tanahun District include:

 Notre Dame School – Bandipur
 Western Regional Police Boarding High School – Belchautara; branch of the Nepal Police School

 Satyawati Secondary School, Damauli
Shree Mahendra Jyoti Higher Secondary School, Shyamgha,(Tanahu )
 Vyas Divya Jyoti School, Damauli

Terhathum District
Schools in the Terhathum District include:

 Annapurna Secondary English Boarding School – Myanglung
 Araniko Secondary English Boarding School – Myanglung
 Ishibu Higher Secondary School – Ishibu
 Singha Bahini Higher Secondary School – Myanglung

Udayapur District
Schools in the Udayapur District include:

 Udayapur Secondary English School - Gaighat

See also

 Education in Nepal
 Lists of schools

References

External links

 List of higher secondary schools of Nepal